Huachenglu station, is a station of Line 9 of the Guangzhou Metro. It started operations on 28 December 2017.

Guangzhou North railway station gained a metro station on 28 December 2017, but due to the construction of the Guangzhou–Qingyuan intercity railway, the metro station is inaccessible from the national rail station. Therefore, passengers need to get off at this station (Huachenglu) and walk along the road, or take a shuttle bus.

Station layout

Exits

References

Railway stations in China opened in 2017
Guangzhou Metro stations in Huadu District